The Richmond Roadrunners/Richmond Saints were an Atlantic Coast Football League team that played four seasons from 1967 to 1970. They were affiliated with the New Orleans Saints from 1969 to 1970. They changed their name from the "Roadrunners" to the "Saints" in their final season, 1970. The Roadrunners played their home games at City Stadium. They had three head coaches in their existence.

Season-by-season

Notes

References

American football teams established in 1968
American football teams disestablished in 1970